Mary Wollstonecraft (1759–1797) was a British writer, philosopher, and advocate of women's rights.

Wollstonecraft may also refer to:

Wollstonecraft, New South Wales, suburb of Sydney, Australia, named after Edward
Wollstonecraft railway station, railway station in the suburb

People with the surname
Mary Wollstonecraft Shelley (1797–1851), author of Frankenstein, daughter of Mary Wollstonecraft
Edward Wollstonecraft (1783–1832), merchant and explorer, nephew of Mary Wollstonecraft
Fanny Imlay, also known as Frances Wollstonecraft, daughter of Mary Wollstonecraft
Anne Kingsbury Wollstonecraft (1791-1828), botanist, naturalist, botanical illustrator, sister-in-law of Mary Wollstonecraft